Čeněk Šlégl (30 September 1899 – 17 February 1970) was a Czech film actor. He appeared in 68 films between 1919 and 1941.

Selected filmography

 Never the Twain (1926)
 Prague Seamstresses (1929)
 Sin of a Beautiful Woman (1929)
 Imperial and Royal Field Marshal (1930)
 Když struny lkají (1930)
 Černé oči, proč pláčete...? (1930)
 Business Under Distress (1931)
 The Affair of Colonel Redl (1931)
 Anton Spelec, Sharp-Shooter (1932)
 The Ideal Schoolmaster (1932)
 Public Not Admitted (1933)
 Hrdinný kapitán Korkorán (1934)
 Hrdina jedné noci (1935)
 Long Live with Dearly Departed (1935)
 Irca's Romance (1936)
 Lawyer Vera (1937)
 Tři vejce do skla (1937)
 Ducháček Will Fix It (1938)
 Škola základ života (1938)
 U pokladny stál... (1939)
 Christian (1939)
 The Catacombs (1940)
 Baron Prášil (1940)
 The Blue Star Hotel (1941)

References

External links
 

1899 births
1970 deaths
Czech male film actors
Czech male silent film actors
20th-century Czech male actors
Male actors from Prague
Czech film directors